Joseph Yingling (1867–1903) was a professional baseball pitcher. He appeared in one game in Major League Baseball for the Washington Nationals in 1886. Yingling was born in Baltimore, Maryland, and also died there at age 36 from bronchitis. He was 19 when he played with the Nationals.

Coincidentally, Joe's brother, Charlie Yingling, also appeared in just one major league game, in his case as a shortstop. In 1887, the two were teammates on the minor league baseball team in Haverhill, Massachusetts.

References

External links

Major League Baseball pitchers
Washington Nationals (1886–1889) players
Minneapolis Millers (baseball) players
Haverhill (minor league baseball) players
Baseball players from Baltimore
1867 births
1903 deaths
19th-century baseball players